Harper is a city in Harper County, Kansas, United States.  As of the 2020 census, the population of the city was 1,313.

History
Harper was founded in 1877 by a colony from Iowa. The city of Harper, like Harper County, is named for Sergeant Marion Harper of the 2nd Kansas Cavalry, who fell in the (American) Civil War. Harper was incorporated as a city in 1880.

The first post office in Harper was established in May 1877 as Cora City, but in June of that year, the post office was renamed Harper.

Geography
Harper is located at  (37.285252, -98.026615).

Demographics

2010 census
As of the census of 2010, there were 1,473 people, 624 households, and 385 families living in the city. The racial makeup of the city was 92.2% White, 0.2% African American, 1.3% Native American, 0.1% Asian, 0.5% Pacific Islander, 4.8% from other races, and 1.0% from two or more races. Hispanic or Latino of any race were 10.0% of the population.

There were 624 households, of which 30.9% had children under the age of 18 living with them, 47.0% were married couples living together, 8.7% had a female householder with no husband present, 6.1% had a male householder with no wife present, and 38.3% were non-families. 34.5% of all households were made up of individuals, and 15.4% had someone living alone who was 65 years of age or older. The average household size was 2.33 and the average family size was 2.95.

The median age in the city was 40.3 years. 25.1% of residents were under the age of 18; 8% were between the ages of 18 and 24; 22.8% were from 25 to 44; 25.1% were from 45 to 64; and 19.1% were 65 years of age or older. The gender makeup of the city was 50.2% male and 49.8% female.

2000 census
As of the census of 2000, there were 1,567 people, 675 households, and 417 families living in the city. The racial makeup of the city was 97.57% White, 0.13% African American, 0.64% Native American, 0.57% from other races, and 1.08% from two or more races. Hispanic or Latino of any race were 1.21% of the population.

There were 675 households, out of which 28.0% had children under the age of 18 living with them, 51.3% were married couples living together, 8.7% had a female householder with no husband present, and 38.2% were non-families. 35.3% of all households were made up of individuals, and 18.1% had someone living alone who was 65 years of age or older. The average household size was 2.29 and the average family size was 2.98.

In the city, the population was spread out, with 26.0% under the age of 18, 6.4% from 18 to 24, 22.0% from 25 to 44, 23.9% from 45 to 64, and 21.7% who were 65 years of age or older. The median age was 42 years. For every 100 females, there were 93.5 males. For every 100 females age 18 and over, there were 93.2 males.

The median income for a household in the city was $30,272, and the median income for a family was $40,761. Males had a median income of $29,583 versus $19,779 for females. The per capita income for the city was $16,543. About 6.9% of families and 9.5% of the population were below the poverty line, including 11.0% of those under age 18 and 6.4% of those age 65 or over.

Education
The community is served by Chaparral USD 361 public school district. USD 361 was created through school unification that consolidated Anthony and Harper schools.

Both Anthony and Harper have elementary schools. The district high school, Chaparral High School, is located halfway between the two towns. The Chaparral High School mascot is Roadrunners.

Harper High School was closed through school unification. The Harper High School mascot was Bearcats.

Cultural references
An episode on the NBC sitcom Veronica's Closet which aired from 1997 to 2000 called Veronica's Big Homecoming was about Harper .

References

Further reading

External links

 City of Harper
 Harper - Directory of Public Officials
 Harper city map, KDOT

Cities in Kansas
Cities in Harper County, Kansas